Juan Martínez López (born March 21, 1950) is a Mexican sprint canoer who competed from the late 1960s to the mid-1970s. Competing in three Summer Olympics, he earned his best finish of fourth in the C-2 1000 m event at Mexico City in 1968.

References
Sports-reference.com profile

1950 births
Canoeists at the 1968 Summer Olympics
Canoeists at the 1972 Summer Olympics
Canoeists at the 1976 Summer Olympics
Living people
Mexican male canoeists
Olympic canoeists of Mexico
20th-century Mexican people